Agia Paraskevi (Agía Paraskeví) is a suburb and a municipality in the northeastern part of the Athens agglomeration, Greece. It is part of the North Athens regional unit. Agia Paraskevi was named after the main church of the town, which is dedicated to Saint Paraskevi of Rome.

Geography

The municipality has an area of 7.935 km2. The built-up area of Agia Paraskevi is continuous with those of the neighboring Cholargos, Chalandri and Gerakas. Besides the central area around the Agia Paraskevi Square, Agia Paraskevi consists of 7 districts: Kontopefko, Nea Zoi, Tsakos, Stavros, Aigiannis, Pefkakia and Paradeisos. The National Center of Scientific Research Demokritos, which hosts the sole nuclear reactor in Greece, is situated in Agia Paraskevi. It is also home of the Greek Ministry of Agriculture.

The main thoroughfare is Mesogeion Avenue, which connects Agia Paraskevi with central Athens. The eastern beltway Motorway 64 passes through the southeastern part of the municipality. The municipality is served by several metro stations and a suburban railway station, located in adjacent municipalities.

History

Agia Paraskevi was part of the community of Chalandri until 1931, when it became a separate community. It became a municipality in 1963. Formerly a farmers' village, it experienced much suburban development since the 1950s.

In 1993, there was considerable opposition from inhabitants of the suburb to the construction of the Hymettus ring road (Motorway 64). The ring road was to form a major highway on the mountainside linked directly to the Motorway 6, and the construction of both motorways were to commence immediately. The realization that this plan would demand the felling of a considerable number of trees, as well as spurring an increase in noise pollution, predictably aroused the opposition of the local population, who requested a different solution: a covered road. However, the government would not reverse the decision and, in fact, sent bulldozers to the mountainside. This led to a riot in April, 1993. Thousands of people traveled up the mountainside and faced the bulldozers, forcing the drivers to leave. At length police arrived and managed to force the demonstrators off the site; eventually the construction of the two highways began, and was completed in 2001. The road was covered only at a small section, that running over the Deree College.

Cultural clubs and activities 

The following cultural clubs, activities and workshops are available in Agia Paraskevi:

Municipal Conservatory, Art Workshops, Choir, Philharmonic Orchestra, Theater Group & Drama Club, Dance Classes, Film Club and Open Air Cinema, Open University courses and various other cultural clubs that organize events throughout the year.

Sports 
The football team of the city is Agia Paraskevi F.C., known as "Santa", attracting devoted fans. During the Olympic games in 2004, a part of the historical Marathon passed through Agia Paraskevi over Mesogeion avenue. Agia Paraskevi hosts also two basketball clubs with earlier presence in the higher national divisions, Basketball Agia Paraskevi and GS Agia Paraskevi.And P.A.O.D.A.P. city organization with individual sports like tennis, fighting sports and more.

Education

The Lycée Franco-Hellénique Eugène Delacroix (LFH), a French international school, is in the town and The American College of Greece.

In Agia Paraskevi, there are the following public educational institutes and schools: 13 kindergarten schools, 11 elementary schools, 6 junior high schools (including one for the hearing impaired) and 5 high schools (including one for the hearing impaired). There are also 3 vocational-technical high schools (including one for the hearing impaired).

Twin towns
Agia Paraskevi is twinned with:
 Saint-Brieuc, France (May 1992)
 Grocka, Serbia  (May 1994)
 Geroskipou, Cyprus (May 1998)

Historical population

References

External links
City of Agia Paraskevi official website 
FACEBOOK OFFICIAL GROUP of Agia Paraskevi 

 
Municipalities of Attica
Populated places in North Athens (regional unit)